"Dancefloor" is the third single from the North London indie group The Holloways. It debuted at #41 in the UK charts. Its title track was included in The Holloways' debut album So This is Great Britain?.

Track listing 
 "Dancefloor"
 "Your Fragrance Was Worn by an Ex of Mine"
 "Hatred and Anger"

External links
Music Video directed by Paul Morricone

2007 singles
The Holloways songs
2006 songs
Song recordings produced by Clive Langer